Live! is a live album by Habib Koité & Bamada

Track listing
 "Muso Ko" (Amsterdam, July 13, 2002)
 "Fatma" (Tübingen, June 28, 2002)
 "Ma Ya" (Oldenburg, June 29, 2002)
 "Sirata" (Cremona, April 25, 2002)
 "Batoumambe" (Zurich, November 3, 2001)
 "Bitile" (Oldenburg, June 29, 2002)
 "Imada" (Muhletal, June 21, 2002)
 "Kanawa" (Wurselen, July 30, 2002)
 "Wari" (Tübingen, June 28, 2002)

 "Nanale" (Tübingen, June 28, 2002)
 "Komine" (Frick, June 22, 2002)
 "Nimato" (Luzern, July 6, 2002)
 "Saramaya" (Tübingen, June 28, 2002)
 "Sin Djen Djen" (Amsterdam, July 13, 2002)
 "Wassiye" (Tübingen, July 28, 2002)
 "Cigarette Abana" (Zurich, November 3, 2001)
 "Kunfe Ta" (Oldenburg, June 29, 2002)
 "Takamba" (Biel, July 18, 2002)

2004 live albums